Alexandra López, commonly known as Alex Lopez is a Brazilian-Nigerian actress and former model, who is best known for her starring role as a lesbian in Zeb Ejiro’s 1996 controversial movie Domitila II. In 1993, she was second runner-up in the popular beauty pageant, Most Beautiful Girl in Nigeria.

Early life
López, of Afro-Brazilian, and Nigerian (Igbo) descent, was born in Jos and was trained at Obosi, Anambra state in southeastern Nigeria. She is the second child from a family of five girls and a boy.

Career
López starred in Faruk Lasaki's Changing Faces where she played Franca, the caring Nigerian wife of Dale, a successful white architect. She has also played lead and supporting roles in Nollywood movies like Domitilla, Love, Sex & Marriage, Dangerous Girls, Abuja Connection 2&3, Emotional Hazard, The One I Love, Akata, Catastrophe, Jungle Justice, Moving Train, Remarkable Pains, Scout, Sisters On the Run, Six Problem Girls, The Good The Bad And The Terrible and Walls Have Ears. She played a lesbian in Zeb Ejiro's movie Domitilla.

Due to her mixed ethnicity, she is often referred to as "the half-caste Nollywood actress".

Personal life
As of 2011, Lopez was unmarried and had a son. In July 2013, it was reported that López and Slim Burna, the Port Harcourt-based Nigerian singer, were dating. Both responded that they were just friends.

Filmography

References

External links
 

Living people
Igbo actresses
Actresses from Jos
20th-century Nigerian actresses
21st-century Nigerian actresses
Nigerian people of Brazilian descent
Year of birth missing (living people)